Cremastobombycia verbesinella is a moth of the family Gracillariidae. It is known from Florida, United States.

The wingspan is about 6.4 mm.

The larvae feed on Verbesina virginica. They mine the leaves of their host plant. The mine has the form of a roomy tent-shaped mine on the underside of the leaf. The lower epidermis is much wrinkled longitudinally. Pupation takes place in an elongate white cocoon suspended at both ends like a hammock inside the mine.

References

Lithocolletinae
Moths of North America
Lepidoptera of the United States
Moths described in 1900
Taxa named by August Busck